The Permanent Joint Board on Defense (spelled Defence in Canadian English) is the senior advisory body on continental military defence of North America. The board was established by Canada and the United States on August 17, 1940 under the Ogdensburg Agreement, signed by President Franklin D. Roosevelt and Prime Minister William Lyon Mackenzie King at Ogdensburg, New York.

The board consists of both Canadian and American military and civilian representatives. The main purpose of the group is to provide policy-level consultation on bilateral defence matters. Periodically the board conducts studies and reports to the governments of the United States and Canada.  The board, which is co-chaired by a Canadian and an American, meets semi-annually, alternating between either country.

The joint board is similar to several entities formed earlier by the two countries. In 1909 they formed the International Joint Commission, which by 1940 had successfully resolved issues regarding waters along the Canada–United States border; another was the International Pacific Salmon Fisheries Commission. Such bodies' success likely influenced the design of the Permanent Joint Board on Defense.

See also
 Military history of Canada
 Military history of the United States
 Ogdensburg Agreement
 NORAD
 DEW Line
 Canadian-American relations
 United States Department of Defense
 Department of National Defence (Canada)

Further reading
Stacey, C. P. "The Canadian-American Permanent Joint Board on Defence, 1940–1945". International Journal 9, 2 (1954); 107–24.

References

External links
 Permanent Joint Board on Defence backgrounder

International military organizations
International organizations based in the Americas
Canada–United States relations
Department of National Defence (Canada)
United States Department of Defense
1940 establishments in North America
1940 establishments in New York (state)